Ángel Lizardo Cheme Ortiz (born 19 November 1981) is an Ecuadorian footballer.

He played the majority of his professional career as Gonzalo Javier Chila Palma, and claimed a date of birth of 9 December 1984, thus enabling him to play in age-restricted matches for three years after he was entitled to do so.

Identity case
In December 2010, Cheme was accused of aggravated identity theft by the actual Gonzalo Chila, an evangelical pastor in Guayaquil. This led the Ecuadorian Football Federation (FEF) to investigate the accusations and apply any applicable punishments. FEF concluded that Cheme had used Chila's identity to play and was suspended for one year.

References

External links
FEF player card of Ángel Cheme
FEF player card of "Gonzalo Chila"

1981 births
Living people
Sportspeople from Esmeraldas, Ecuador
Association football midfielders
Ecuadorian footballers
Ecuadorian Serie A players
S.D. Aucas footballers
C.D. Olmedo footballers
L.D.U. Quito footballers
S.D. Quito footballers
C.D. ESPOLI footballers
L.D.U. Loja footballers
C.D. Cuenca footballers